Patriot Place is an open-air shopping center owned by The Kraft Group built around Gillette Stadium, the home of the New England Patriots and New England Revolution. It is located in Foxborough, Massachusetts.

The first phase opened in fall 2007, which included the construction of a small strip mall. The second phase is built on what were parking lots for Gillette Stadium, which in turn were previously the site of the now-demolished Foxboro Stadium. Phase two of Patriot Place is also home to one of the first locations for Showcase Cinemas' Cinema de Lux brand.

Tenants

Bass Pro Shops built their first New England location at the Patriot Place; it was among the first stores to be announced and opened in the complex. It includes an animatronic shooting range and overlooks a small swamp that was once part of a larger one that the store was built over with land reclamation. Many events are held there as well.

Patriot Place has various restaurants, such as CBS Sporting Club, which features American cuisine. Around the complex are over 125 HDTVs showing games by the Patriots, as well as classic programs once shown on CBS. The restaurant shut down after the 2022-23 New England Patriots season. 

Cinema de Lux was launched by Showcase Cinemas with a location at the complex. It is aimed more upmarket with an American-style restaurant and a live music venture known as Showcase Live. The theater has 14 screens. There is also a bar and restaurant inside.

The Brigham and Women's/Mass General Health Care Center is a four-story outpatient health care center and a joint venture between Brigham and Women's Hospital and Massachusetts General Hospital, both located in Boston.

Renaissance Hotel is a four-star hotel.

Patriots Hall of Fame

Opened in September 2008, the Patriots Hall of Fame presented by Raytheon Technologies is a museum that includes the New England Patriots Hall of Fame and displays the history of the New England Patriots – including historical wins and losses, memorabilia, the game-worn uniforms and equipment of famous players such as Tom Brady, Rob Gronkowski, Wes Welker, Julian Edelman, Ty Law, Randy Moss, John Hannah, Mike Haynes, and Andre Tippett, the six Super Bowl trophies among other trophies and awards, such as the numerous Lamar Hunt trophies.

See also
American Dream Meadowlands
Titletown District

References

Shopping malls in Massachusetts
Shopping malls established in 2007
Buildings and structures in Foxborough, Massachusetts
New England Patriots
Tourist attractions in Norfolk County, Massachusetts
2007 establishments in Massachusetts